The Women's 100 metre backstroke S10 event at the 2020 Paralympic Games took place on 2 September 2021, at the Tokyo Aquatics Centre.

Final

References

Swimming at the 2020 Summer Paralympics
2021 in women's swimming